Changchun Normal University (originally Changhun Teacher's College) is a university in Changchun, Jilin province, People's Republic of China.

The school currently has 61 undergraduate majors, covering the five disciplines of humanities, social sciences, science, engineering, and management.

External links
 Changchun Normal University 

Universities and colleges in Jilin
Teachers colleges in China